Cheung Kong Graduate School of Business (CKGSB) is a private, non-profit, independent educational institution and the only business school in China with faculty governance. 

The school offers MBA, Finance MBA, Executive MBA, Business Scholars Program, and short-term Executive Education programs to both Chinese and international students. 

The faculty staff is made up of 45 full-time professors and 10 long-term visiting professors currently, with research focusing from global business issues to China-specific topics. In its 10 years the school has trained about 3000 CEOs from various Chinese companies, with notable alumni including the founder of the Alibaba Group, Jack Ma; Fu Chengyu, Chairman of Sinopec; and Wu Yajun, the fifth richest person and the richest woman in China as of 2012.

Established in November 2002 through the financial support of the Li Ka Shing Foundation, today CKGSB is considered one of the major graduate business schools in China, with a leading role in the growing Chinese private sector. As of 2011 CKGSB alumni collectively managed above $1 trillion in revenues, equal to 13.7% of the Chinese GDP in that year. Headquartered in Beijing, CKGSB has campuses in Shanghai and Shenzhen, as well as offices in Hong Kong, New York City and London.

School name and Logo 

The "Cheung Kong" from CKGSB's name comes directly from the name of Li Ka Shing's Cheung Kong (Holdings). "Cheung Kong" in Cantonese (and "Chang Jiang" in Mandarin) is the name for China's longest river, the Yangtze River. The logo recalls the seal used by ancient Chinese scholars, and is an evocation of the school's grounding in Chinese heritage. The three vertical lines in the logo represent the ancient Chinese writing style, while the three horizontal ones indicate Western style writing, overall symbolizing the integration of Eastern and Western values and knowledge in the school. The lower right corner represents the Mandarin initials of the Yangtze River, "Chang Jiang".

Faculty and Research 
The CKGSB faculty comprises an international staff of 45 full-time professors and 10 long-term visiting professors as of 2015. Most of the faculty members are of Chinese origin, but all have pursued higher education at leading Western graduate schools, including Stanford, Harvard, Wharton and Yale. According to the school such make-up gives the faculty body a strong understanding of the Chinese market as well as a high academic profile and understanding of Western higher education practices. According to the CKGSB faculty, its per capita research publication rate in "top-tier" academic journals from 2006 to 2011 ranked 6th in the world. The school on the other hand currently adheres to a policy of not partaking in international business school rankings.

Case Center

The CKGSB Case Center is a unit specialized in the production of teaching material for executive education. It manages, updates and expands a portfolio of business strategy cases in English and Chinese to be used as practical business scenario training in the school's programs. Cases range from China-specific topics such as Chinese real estate market to internationals ones such as multinational acquisitions. As of 2013 the Center's library created a portfolio of more than two hundred case studies, subdivided into different major disciplinary subjects: Accounting and Finance, Business Model Innovation, Economics, Globalization and Strategy, Logistics, Operations, HR Management and Marketing. Cases are derived from faculty research and on the basis of teaching interests, often featuring CKGSB alumni business cases. Cases generally outline Chinese and international business scenarios.

Knowledge Center

CKGSB Knowledge is an English language publication which provides business and economic analysis from the business school's faculty. It focuses on China-specific business trends, while also providing coverage of emerging markets in the global business landscape. Topics are subdivided into Policy and Law, Economy, Management, Technology, Manufacturing and Society, with topics ranging from Joint ventures to Sustainability.

Library 
The CKGSB Library in Beijing has a total holdings of more than 600,000 print and digital Chinese and English books, 150+ periodicals, thousands of scholarly e-journals, and a diverse range of both Chinese and international databases such as Proquest and ISI Emerging Markets. The main library is located in Beijing’s Oriental Plaza campus, while Two branch libraries have been established on the Shanghai Campus and Shenzhen Campus.

Programs 
CKGSB offers programs to both Chinese and international students in its mainland China based campuses. Classes are offered in both Chinese and English. 25% of the MBA students are international, while the percentage varies from Chinese executive specific programs to short-term programs for international executives/ MBA students. The programs are amongst the most expensive of Chinese business schools, with the EMBA programme being the most expensive programme in China.

EMBA
The EMBA is a 20-month-long program for C-suit executives, with classes meeting once per month for 4 days, Thursday to Sunday, with the first class being a one-week residency. It is open to both Chinese and international executives. Classes generally consist of lectures by faculty or notable alumni, group work, case studies and business visits. The EMBA program was listed number one EMBA in China in terms of returns after graduation by Forbes. Admission criteria include a minimum of eight years work experience, with minimum five in a managerial position, and serving at a decision making position at the time of application.

MBA
MBA programs are 14 months full-time English programs. Eligibility is based on two years of work experience, English fluency, Bachelor's degree and competitive GMAT or GRE score. As of 2013 the selection involves three stages: first the application made of recommendation letters, degree certificate, and academic transcript must be approved by the school; second candidates must undergo an interview process with a panel of CKGSB faculty, alumni and staff, divided into 3 stages: group case discussion, panel interview and career consultation. The third stage is a comparative evaluation, where the selection panel compares different candidates to select students for allocated quota of MBA students.

List of programs
 Chinese Language Programs
 Executive MBA
 China CEO Program
 Finance MBA (part-time)
MBA 
 Business Scholars Program
Master of Entrepreneurship and Technology Innovation (METI)
Advanced Management Program
 Media Management Program
 Real Estate Management Program
 Family Business Program
 Company Specific Programs
 English Language Programs
 MBA
 Cutting-edge Insights from China
 China CEO
China Start
Impact Leadership in the Era of Global Disruptions 
China Ready Certificate 
How to Retail to China Without Being There
Global Emerging Leaders in Family Enterprises
Global Programs on Family Business Succession
FinTech for Executives 
COVID-19-Driven Digitalization in Asia
Innovative Retail Strategies and Best Practices in Brazil, China and the U.S.
ASEAN New Economy Leadership
 Boardroom Briefing (Customized Program)
 China Immersion (Customized Program)
 Win in China (Customized Program)
 Korean Language Programs
 China Business Executive MBA

Alumni 

Notable CKGSB alumni include:
 Jack Ma - Chairman and CEO of Alibaba Group
 Fu Chengyu - Chairman and CEO of China National Offshore Oil Corporation, Chairman of Sinopec
 Zhang Lan - Chairwoman and Founder of South Beauty Restaurant Group Ltd.
 Wang Hanhua - CEO, Amazon.cn
 Jin Zhiguo - President, Tsingtao Brewery Group
 Fan Min - Co-Founder and CEO, Ctrip
 Yu Liang - CEO China Vanke
 Jason Jiang - Chairman of Focus Media Holding
 Niu Gensheng - Chairman and CEO of China Mengniu Dairy Company Limited
 Li Dongsheng - Chairman, CEO, and President of TCL Corporation
 Guo Guangchang - Chairman, CEO, and Founder of Fosun International Limited
 Zhao Benshan - Chairman Ben Mountain Media Group; Chinese comic actor
 Chen Yihong - Founder and Chairman, China Dongxiang
 Frank NG -  CEO, Ourgame
 Wang Zhentao - Founder, Aokang Group
 Wu Yajun - Founder and Chairwoman, Longfor Properties
 Ding Shizhong - Chairman, Anta Sports
 Liu Fucai - General Director, SASAC Guangdong
 Lin Zuoming - President, Aviation Industry Corporation of China
 Zhou Chengjian - Chairman and President, Meters/Bonwe
 Xie Boyang - Chairman, Minsheng Life Insurance
 Wang Minghui - Chairman and President, Yunnan Baiyao
 GuoZhenxi - Director of CCTV 2 & Director of Advertising Economic Information Center, China Central Television
 Sandeep Bahl - Regional General Manager Asia, Air New Zealand
 Fabian Wong - CEO Greater China, Philips Consumer Lifestyle
 Peng xiaofeng - Founder and CEO of LDK Solar Co., Ltd.
 Dennis Wang - Chairman Huayi Brothers.
 Ji Qi - Chairman and CEO of  China Lodging Group, Ltd.
 Yu Mingfang - Vice-President of Belle International
 Li Na - Former professional tennis player with career-high ranking of world No. 2 on the WTA Tour on 17 February 2014
Wu Jing - actor and director of highest grossing film in China (i.e. "Wolf Warrior 2") and actor in 2nd top grossing film in China, "The Wandering Earth"
 Kim Sang-heon - Former CEO of Naver
 Moon Kook-hyun - Former CEO of Yuhan-Kimberly

References

External links 
English Website of CKGSB
Chinese Website of CKGSB
CKGSB Knowledge Center
Cheung Kong Graduate School of Business, Annual Report 2009

Business schools in China
Educational institutions established in 2002
2002 establishments in China